Shengmai Wan is a brown pill used in Traditional Chinese medicine to "replenish qi, restore normal pulse, nourish yin and promote the production of body fluids". It is aromatic and tastes sour, sweet and slightly bitter. It is used where there is "deficiency of qi and yin marked by cardiac palpitation, shortness of breath, scarcely perceptible pulse and spontaneous sweating".

Chinese classic herbal formula

See also
 Chinese classic herbal formula
 Bu Zhong Yi Qi Wan

References

Traditional Chinese medicine pills